Frankenstein's monster or Frankenstein's creature, often referred to as simply "Frankenstein",<ref>For example, in Peggy Webling's 1927 stage play, and the 2004 film, Van Helsing.</ref> is a fictional character who first appeared in Mary Shelley's 1818 novel Frankenstein; or, The Modern Prometheus as the main antagonist. Shelley's title thus compares the monster's creator, Victor Frankenstein, to the mythological character Prometheus, who fashioned humans out of clay and gave them fire.

In Shelley's Gothic story, Victor Frankenstein builds the creature in his laboratory through an ambiguous method based on a scientific principle he discovered. The monster attempts to fit into human society but is shunned, which leads him to seek revenge against Frankenstein. According to the scholar Joseph Carroll, the monster occupies "a border territory between the characteristics that typically define protagonists and antagonists".

Frankenstein's monster became iconic in popular culture, and has been featured in various forms of media, including films, television series, merchandise and video games. The most popularly recognized versions are the film portrayals by Boris Karloff in the 1931 film Frankenstein, the 1935 sequel Bride of Frankenstein, and the 1939 sequel Son of Frankenstein.Names

Mary Shelley's original novel never gives the monster a name, although when speaking to his creator, Victor Frankenstein, the monster does say "I ought to be thy Adam" (in reference to the first man created in the Bible).  Frankenstein refers to his creation as "creature", "fiend", "spectre", "the dæmon", "wretch", "devil", "thing", "being", and "ogre". Frankenstein's creation referred to himself as a "monster" at least once, as did the residents of a hamlet who saw the creature towards the end of the novel.

As in Shelley's story, the creature's namelessness became a central part of the stage adaptations in London and Paris during the decades after the novel's first appearance. In 1823, Shelley herself attended a performance of Richard Brinsley Peake's Presumption, the first successful stage adaptation of her novel. "The play bill amused me extremely, for in the list of dramatis personae came _, by Mr T. Cooke," she wrote to her friend Leigh Hunt. "This nameless mode of naming the unnameable is rather good."

Within a decade of publication, the name of the creator—Frankenstein—was used to refer to the creature, but it did not become firmly established until much later. The story was adapted for the stage in 1927 by Peggy Webling, and Webling's Victor Frankenstein does give the creature his name. However, the creature has no name in the Universal film series starring Boris Karloff during the 1930s, which was largely based upon Webling's play. The 1931 Universal film treated the creature's identity in a similar way as Shelley's novel: in the opening credits, the character is referred to merely as "The Monster" (the actor's name is replaced by a question mark, but Karloff is listed in the closing credits). However, in the sequel Bride of Frankenstein (1935), the frame narration by a character representing Shelley's friend Lord Byron does refer to the monster as Frankenstein, although this scene takes place not quite in-universe. Nevertheless, the creature soon enough became best known in the popular imagination as "Frankenstein". This usage is sometimes considered erroneous, but some usage commentators regard the monster sense of "Frankenstein" as well-established and not an error.

Modern practice varies somewhat. For example, in Dean Koontz's Frankenstein, first published in 2004, the creature is named "Deucalion", after the character from Greek mythology, who is the son of the Titan Prometheus, a reference to the original novel's title.  Another example is the second episode of Showtime's Penny Dreadful, which first aired in 2014; Victor Frankenstein briefly considers naming his creation "Adam", before deciding instead to let the monster "pick his own name". Thumbing through a book of the works of William Shakespeare, the monster chooses "Proteus" from The Two Gentlemen of Verona. It is later revealed that Proteus is actually the second monster Frankenstein has created, with the first, abandoned creation having been named "Caliban", from The Tempest, by the theatre actor who took him in and later, after leaving the theatre, named himself after the English poet John Clare. Another example is an attempt by Randall Munroe of webcomic xkcd to make "Frankenstein" the canonical name of the monster, by publishing a short derivative version which directly states that it is. In The Strange Case of the Alchemist's Daughter, the 2017 novel by Theodora Goss, the creature is named Adam.

Shelley's plot

Victor Frankenstein builds the creature over a two-year period in the attic of his boarding house in Ingolstadt after discovering a scientific principle which allows him to create life from non-living matter. Frankenstein is disgusted by his creation, however, and flees from it in horror. Frightened, and unaware of his own identity, the monster wanders through the wilderness.

He finds solace beside a remote cottage inhabited by an older, blind man and his two children. Eavesdropping, the creature familiarizes himself with their lives and learns to speak, whereby he becomes an eloquent, educated, and well-mannered individual. During this time, he also finds Frankenstein's journal in the pocket of the jacket he found in the laboratory and learns how he was created. The creature eventually introduces himself to the family's blind father, who treats him with kindness. When the rest of the family returns, however, they are frightened of him and drive him away. Enraged, the creature feels that humankind is his enemy and begins to hate his creator for abandoning him. However, although he despises Frankenstein, he sets out to find him, believing that he is the only person who will help him. On his journey, the creature rescues a young girl from a river but is shot in the shoulder by the child's father, believing the creature intended to harm his child. Enraged by this final act of cruelty, the creature swears revenge on humankind for the suffering they have caused him. He seeks revenge against his creator in particular for leaving him alone in a world where he is hated. Using the information in Frankenstein's notes, the creature resolves to find him.

The monster kills Victor's younger brother William upon learning of the boy's relation to his creator and frames Justine Moritz, a young woman who lives with the Frankensteins, as the culprit (causing her execution afterwards). When Frankenstein retreats to the Alps, the monster approaches him at the summit, recounts his experiences, and asks his creator to build him a female mate. He promises, in return, to disappear with his mate and never trouble humankind again, but threatens to destroy everything Frankenstein holds dear should he fail or refuse. Frankenstein agrees, and eventually constructs a female creature on a remote island in Orkney, but aghast at the possibility of creating a race of monsters, destroys the female creature before it is complete. Horrified and enraged, the creature immediately appears, and gives Frankenstein a final threat: "I will be with you on your wedding night." 

After leaving his creator, the creature goes on to kill Victor's best friend, Henry Clerval, and later kills Frankenstein's bride, Elizabeth Lavenza, on their wedding night, whereupon Frankenstein's father dies of grief. With nothing left to live for but revenge, Frankenstein dedicates himself to destroying his creation, and the creature goads him into pursuing him north, through Scandinavia and into Russia, staying ahead of him the entire way.

As they reach the Arctic Circle and travel over the pack ice of the Arctic Ocean, Frankenstein, suffering from severe exhaustion and hypothermia, comes within a mile of the creature, but is separated from him when the ice he is traveling over splits. A ship exploring the region encounters the dying Frankenstein, who relates his story to the ship's captain, Robert Walton. Later, the monster boards the ship, but upon finding Frankenstein dead, is overcome by grief and pledges to incinerate himself at "the Northernmost extremity of the globe". He then departs, never to be seen again.

Appearance

Shelley described Frankenstein's monster as an  creature of hideous contrasts:His limbs were in proportion, and I had selected his features as beautiful. Beautiful! Great God! His yellow skin scarcely covered the work of muscles and arteries beneath; his hair was of a lustrous black, and flowing; his teeth of a pearly whiteness; but these luxuriances only formed a more horrid contrast with his watery eyes, that seemed almost of the same colour as the dun-white sockets in which they were set, his shrivelled complexion and straight black lips.A picture of the creature appeared in the 1831 edition. Early stage portrayals dressed him in a toga, shaded, along with the monster's skin, a pale blue. Throughout the 19th century, the monster's image remained variable according to the artist.

Portrayals in film

The best-known image of Frankenstein's monster in popular culture derives from Boris Karloff's portrayal in the 1931 movie Frankenstein, in which he wore makeup applied and designed by Jack P. Pierce, who based the monster's face and iconic flat head shape on a drawing Pierce's daughter (whom Pierce feared to be psychic) had drawn from a dream. Universal Studios, which released the film, was quick to secure ownership of the copyright for the makeup format. Karloff played the monster in two more Universal films, Bride of Frankenstein and Son of Frankenstein; Lon Chaney Jr. took over the part from Karloff in The Ghost of Frankenstein; Bela Lugosi portrayed the role in Frankenstein Meets the Wolf Man; and Glenn Strange played the monster in the last three Universal Studios films to feature the character – House of Frankenstein, House of Dracula, and Abbott and Costello Meet Frankenstein. However, the makeup worn by subsequent actors replicated the iconic look first worn by Karloff. The image of Karloff's face is currently owned by his daughter's company, Karloff Enterprises, secured for her in a lawsuit for which she was represented by attorney Bela G. Lugosi (Bela Lugosi's son), after which Universal replaced Karloff's features with those of Glenn Strange in most of their marketing. In 1969, the New York Times mistakenly ran a photograph of Strange for Karloff's obituary.

Since Karloff's portrayal, the creature almost always appears as a towering, undead-like figure, often with a flat-topped angular head and bolts on his neck to serve as electrical connectors or grotesque electrodes. He wears a dark, usually tattered, suit having shortened coat sleeves and thick, heavy boots, causing him to walk with an awkward, stiff-legged gait (as opposed to the novel, in which he is described as much more flexible than a human). The tone of his skin varies (although shades of green or gray are common), and his body appears stitched together at certain parts (such as around the neck and joints). This image has influenced the creation of other fictional characters, such as the Hulk.

In the 1957 film The Curse of Frankenstein, Christopher Lee was cast as the creature. The producers Hammer Film Productions refrained from duplicating aspects of Universal's 1931 film, and so Phil Leakey designed a new look for the creature bearing no resemblance to the Boris Karloff design created by Jack Pierce. For his performance as the creature Lee played him as a loose-limbed and childlike, fearful and lonely, with a suggestion of being in pain. Author Paul Leggett describes the creature as being like an abused child; afraid but also violently angry. Christopher Lee, was annoyed on getting the script and discovering that the monster had no dialogue, for this creature was totally mute. According to Marcus K. Harmes in contrasting Lee's creature with the one played by Karloff, "Lee's actions as the monster seem more directly evil, to judge from the expression on his face when he bears down on the helpless old blind man but these are explained in the film as psychopathic impulses caused by brain damage, not the cunning of the literary monster. Lee also evokes considerable pathos in his performance."In this film the aggressive and childish demeanour of the monster are in contrast with that of the murdered Professor Bernstein, once the "finest brain in Europe", from whom the creature's now damaged brain was taken. The sequels to The Curse of Frankenstein would feature the Baron creating various different creatures, none of which would be played by Christopher Lee.

In the 1965 Toho film Frankenstein Conquers the World, the heart of Frankenstein's monster was transported from Germany to Hiroshima as World War II neared its end, only to be irradiated during the atomic bombing of the city, granting it miraculous regenerative capabilities. Over the ensuing 20 years, it grows into a complete human child, who then rapidly matures into a giant, 20-metre-tall man. After escaping a laboratory in the city, he is blamed for the crimes of the burrowing kaiju Baragon, and the two monsters face off in a showdown that ends with Frankenstein's monster victorious, though he falls into the depths of the Earth after the ground collapses beneath his feet. 

In the 1973 TV miniseries Frankenstein: The True Story, in which the creature is played by Michael Sarrazin, he appears as a strikingly handsome man who later degenerates into a grotesque monster due to a flaw in the creation process.

In the 1994 film Mary Shelley's Frankenstein, the creature is played by Robert De Niro and has an appearance closer to that described in the original novel, though this version of the creature possesses balding grey hair and a body covered in bloody stitches. He is, as in the novel, motivated by pain and loneliness. In this version, Frankenstein gives the monster the brain of his mentor, Doctor Waldman, while his body is made from a man who killed Waldman while resisting a vaccination. The monster retains Waldman's "trace memories" that apparently help him quickly learn to speak and read.

In the 2004 film Van Helsing, the monster is shown in a modernized version of the Karloff design. The electrical origin of the creature is emphasized with one electrified dome in the back of his head and another over his heart, and he also has hydraulic pistons in his legs, with the design being similar to that of a steam-punk cyborg. Although not as eloquent as in the novel, this version of the creature is intelligent and relatively nonviolent.

In 2004, a TV miniseries adaptation of Frankenstein was made by Hallmark. Luke Goss plays the creature. This adaptation more closely resembles the monster as described in the novel: intelligent and articulate, with flowing, dark hair and watery eyes.

The 2005 film Frankenstein Reborn portrays the creature as a paraplegic man who tries to regain the ability to walk by having a nanobots surging through his body but has side effects. Instead, the surgeon kills him and resurrects his corpse as a reanimated zombie-like creature. This version of the creature has stitches on his face where he was shot, strains of brown hair, black pants, a dark hoodie, and a black jacket with a brown fur collar.

The 2014 TV series Penny Dreadful also rejects the Karloff design in favour of Shelley's description. This version of the creature has the flowing dark hair described by Shelley, although he departs from her description by having pale grey skin and obvious scars along the right side of his face. Additionally, he is of average height, being even shorter than other characters in the series. In this series, the monster names himself "Caliban", after the character in William Shakespeare's The Tempest. In the series, Victor Frankenstein makes a second and third creature, each more indistinguishable from normal human beings.

Personality
As depicted by Shelley, the creature is a sensitive, emotional person whose only aim is to share his life with another sentient being like himself. The novel portrayed him as versed in Paradise Lost, Plutarch's Lives, and The Sorrows of Young Werther, books he finds after having learnt language. 

From the beginning, the creature is rejected by everyone he meets. He realizes from the moment of his "birth" that even his own creator cannot stand the sight of him; this is obvious when Frankenstein says "…one hand was stretched out, seemingly to detain me, but I escaped…". Upon seeing his own reflection, he realizes that he too is repulsed by his appearance. His greatest desire is to find love and acceptance; but when that desire is denied, he swears revenge on his creator.

The creature is a vegetarian. While speaking to Frankenstein, he tells him, "My food is not that of man; I do not destroy the lamb and the kid to glut my appetite; acorns and berries afford me sufficient nourishment...The picture I present to you is peaceful and human." At the time the novel was written, many writers, including Percy Shelley in A Vindication of Natural Diet, argued that practicing vegetarianism was the morally right thing to do.

Contrary to many film versions, the creature in the novel is very articulate and eloquent in his speech. Almost immediately after his creation, he dresses himself; and within 11 months, he can speak and read German and French. By the end of the novel, the creature is able to speak English fluently as well. The Van Helsing and Penny Dreadful interpretations of the character have similar personalities to the literary original, although the latter version is the only one to retain the character's violent reactions to rejection. In the 1931 film adaptation, the creature is depicted as mute and bestial; it is implied that this is because he is accidentally implanted with a criminal's "abnormal" brain. In the subsequent sequel, Bride of Frankenstein, the creature learns to speak, albeit in short, stunted sentences. However, his intelligence is implied to be fairly developed, since what little dialogue he speaks suggests he has a world-weary attitude to life, and a deep understanding of his unnatural state. When rejected by his bride, he briefly goes through a suicidal state and attempts suicide, blowing up the laboratory he is in. In the second sequel, Son of Frankenstein, the creature is again rendered inarticulate. Following a brain transplant in the third sequel, The Ghost of Frankenstein, the creature speaks with the voice and personality of the brain donor. This was continued after a fashion in the scripting for the fourth sequel, Frankenstein Meets the Wolf Man, but the dialogue was excised before release. The creature was effectively mute in later sequels, although he refers to Count Dracula as his "master" in Abbott and Costello Meet Frankenstein''. The creature is often portrayed as being afraid of fire, although he is not afraid of it in the novel, even using fire to destroy himself.

The monster as a metaphor
Scholars sometimes look for deeper meaning in Shelley's story, and have drawn an analogy between the monster and a motherless child; Shelley's own mother died while giving birth to her. The monster has also been analogized to an oppressed class; Shelley wrote that the monster recognized "the division of property, of immense wealth and squalid poverty". Others see in the monster the dangers of uncontrolled scientific progress, especially as at the time of publishing; Galvanism had convinced many scientists that raising the dead through use of electrical currents was a scientific possibility.

Another proposal is that Victor Frankenstein was based on a real scientist who had a similar name, and who had been called a modern Prometheus – Benjamin Franklin. Accordingly, the monster would represent the new nation that Franklin helped to create out of remnants left by England. Victor Frankenstein's father "made also a kite, with a wire and string, which drew down that fluid from the clouds," wrote Shelley, similar to Franklin's famous kite experiment.

Racial interpretations 

In discussing the physical description of the monster, there has been some speculation about the potential his design is rooted in common perceptions of race during the 18th century. Three scholars have noted that Shelley's description of the monster seems to be racially coded; one argues that, "Shelley's portrayal of her monster drew upon contemporary attitudes towards non-whites, in particular on fears and hopes of the abolition of slavery in the West Indies." Of course, there is no evidence to suggest that the monster's depiction is meant to mimic any race, and such interpretations are based in personal conjectural interpretations of Shelley's text rather than remarks from herself or any known intentions of the author.

In her article "Frankenstein, Racial Science, and the Yellow Peril," Anne Mellor claims that the monster's features share a lot in common with the Mongoloid race. This term, now out of fashion and carrying some negative connotations, is used to describe the "yellow" races of Asia as distinct from the Caucasian or white races. To support her claim, Mellor points out that both Mary and Percy Shelley were friends with William Lawrence, an early proponent of racial science and someone who Mary "continued to consult on medical matters and [met with] socially until his death in 1830." While Mellor points out to allusions to Orientalism and the Yellow Peril, John Malchow in his article "Frankenstein's Monster and Images of Race in Nineteenth-Century Britain" explores the possibility of the monster either being intentionally or unintentionally coded as black. Malchow argues that the monster's depiction is based in an 18th-century understanding of "popular racial discourse [which] managed to conflate such descriptions of particular ethnic characteristics into a general image of the "Negro" body in which repulsive features, brute-like strength and size of limbs featured prominently." Malchow makes it clear that it is difficult to tell if this alleged racial allegory was intentional on Shelley's part or if it was inspired by the society she lived in (or if it exists in the text at all outside of his interpretation), and he states that "There is no clear proof that Mary Shelley consciously set out to create a monster which suggested, explicitly, the Jamaican escaped slave or maroon, or that she drew directly from any person knowledge of either planter or abolitionist propaganda." In addition to the previous interpretations, Karen Lynnea Piper argues in her article, "Inuit Diasporas: Frankenstein and the Inuit in England" that the symbolism surrounding Frankenstein's monster could stem from the Inuit of the Arctic. Piper argues that the monster accounts for the "missing presence" of any indigenous people during Waldon's expedition, and that he represents the fear of the savage, lurking on the outskirts of civilization.

Portrayals

See also

 Frankenstein in popular culture
 List of films featuring Frankenstein's monster
 Allotransplantation, the transplantation of body parts from one person to another

References

External links
 Literary discussion of the argument of Frankenstein
 2014 Irish Examiner article

Fictional murderers of children
Literary characters introduced in 1818
Fictional characters without a name
Fictional characters with superhuman strength
Fictional murderers
Fictional suicides
Fictional undead
Fictional vegan and vegetarian characters
Frankenstein characters
Male horror film villains
Male characters in film
Male characters in literature
Fictional monsters
Toho monsters
Male literary villains
Godzilla characters